Nazar Mohammad Mutmaeen (born 1973) is an Afghani writer, journalist, political analyst and peace activist. He is currently serving as acting head of the Afghanistan National Olympic Committee.

Mutmaeen was born in 1973 in Nad Ali District of Helmand province, Afghanistan. He studied at Nangarhar University and civil engineering in Kabul University.

References

Living people
1973 births
People from Helmand Province
Nangarhar University alumni
Kabul University alumni
Afghan journalists
Afghan writers
Afghan engineers